Hemmatabad (also Romanized as Hemmatābād) is a village in Dastjerd Rural District, Khalajastan District, Qom County, Qom Province, Iran. At the 2006 census, its population was 86, in 27 families.

References 

Populated places in Qom Province